State Route 161 (SR-161) is a  long state highway, designated as a rural major connector, completely within Millard County in central Utah. The highway connects Interstate 70 (I-70) to I-15 while providing service to historic Cove Fort. The route was once part of U.S. Route 91 (US-91), but was renumbered to SR-161 in the 1970s, in parallel with the construction of I-70.

Route description
Located entirely in southeastern Millard County, SR-161 starts at a diamond interchange with the westernmost exit on I-70 before it terminates at I-15. The road continues northward until it reaches the historic Cove Fort and the associated visitors center. On the eastern side of the highway is a Utah Department of Transportation (UDOT) maintenance center. SR-161 starts to make a gentle turn to the northeast, passing a filling station, which also serves as a rest area as part of a public–private partnership between UDOT and the owners of the station. The highway intersects I-15 and comes to an end at a cattle guard on Black Rock Road northwest of the interchange with I-15.

In 2007, a daily average of 455 cars traveled along SR-161, representing only a slight growth from previous years; in 2006, the average was 450 and in 2005, 415). Thirty five percent of this traffic was composed of trucks. The average traffic measurement is collected at a point on SR-161 between Cove Fort and the interchange with I-15.

History
The SR-161 designation has been used two other times for other state routes. The first route, which was formed in 1933, connected US-50/US-89/US-91 (now US-89) to SR-68 in Bluffdale until the route was decommissioned in 1953. From May 8, 1961 to February 14, 1964, the route number was used for a road from US-91 to I-15 in the city of Beaver.

The parallel T-beam bridges that carry I-15 over SR-161 at its northern terminus were constructed in 1966 along with the construction of I-15 though the area. The bridges carrying I-70 over SR-161 were constructed in 1973.

The current route, codified into Utah law in 1965 and designated on signage following the decommissioning of US-91 in the 1970s, was partially a former alignment of US-91. No significant changes have been made to the roadway except for its legal definition. SR-161 serves the important function of providing access to the contracted rest area as well as the historic Cove Fort.  no new projects are scheduled for SR-161, either through the American Recovery and Reinvestment Act or the UDOT Statewide Transportation Improvement Program.

Major intersections

References

161
 161
Utah State Route 161
Utah State Route 161